Raymond IV (died 1199) was the count of Tripoli (1187–1189) and regent of Antioch (1193–1194). He was the son of Bohemond III of Antioch and Orgueilleuse d'Harenc.

When Raymond III of Tripoli died in 1187 without heirs, he left his county to Raymond, who was his godson. After two years, Bohemond III desired to keep his heir closer to his Antiochene court and so brought him back and sent his second son, Bohemond IV, as count to Tripoli. After the elder Bohemond was captured by Leo II of Armenia, Raymond acted as regent until his return.

In 1195, Raymond married Alice of Armenia, Leo II's niece, the daughter of Roupen III, to solidify the peace. They had one son, Raymond-Roupen, who fought for his inheritance as the eldest grandson of Bohemond III.

References

1199 deaths
Counts of Tripoli
Year of birth unknown
House of Poitiers